The first heats of the Women's 200m Individual Medley took place on the morning of Sunday, July 26. The semifinal took place in the evening session of the same day and the final took place on the evening of the 27 July at the Foro Italico in Rome, Italy. The order of swimming in the medley was: Butterfly, backstroke, breaststroke, freestyle

Records
Prior to this competition, the existing world and competition records were as follows:

The following records were established during the competition:

Results

Heats

Semifinals

Finals

External links 
Heats Results
Semifinal Results
Finals Results

References

Medley Women's 200 m
2009 in women's swimming